DIO Groningen is a football club from Groningen in the province Groningen, Netherlands.

History 
The Sunday section of the club played in the 2011–12 Hoofdklasse. Due to financial problems, the club withdrew from the league on 1 December 2011. 

The Saturday section of DIO Groningen still exists. It played 2012–14 in the Reserve Vijfde Klasse. In 2020–2021 it played in the Reserve Vierde Klasse, after playing 2014–20 in the Vijfde Klasse.

References

External links
 Official site

Football clubs in the Netherlands
Football clubs in Groningen (city)
1971 establishments in the Netherlands
Association football clubs established in 1971